A succubus is a type of female demon said to initiate sexual intercourse on males. 

Succubus may also refer to:

Books
"The Succubus" (short story), a story by Honoré de Balzac
The Succubus, a 1979 novel about a succubus by Kenneth Rayner Johnson

Film and television
Succubus (film) (German title: Necronomicon - Geträumte Sünden), a 1968 West German horror film by Jesús Franco
"The Succubus" (South Park), an episode of South Park
Succubus: Hell-Bent, a 2007 horror film with Gary Busey
Succubus, a 1987 television film with Barry Foster, Lynsey Baxter, Pamela Salem and Jeremy Gilley

Gaming
Succubus, a spinoff of Agony
Succubus (Dungeons & Dragons), a monster in Dungeons & Dragons

Other uses
The Succubus (sculpture), a sculpture by Auguste Rodin
"Succubus" (song), a song by Five Finger Death Punch

See also
Succubous, type of leaf arrangement
Incubus (disambiguation)